Metal Rules, also known as Metal-Rules, is a heavy metal webzine created by EvilG established in 1995. Based in the province of Newfoundland, Canada, the site was founded with the goal to promote "Real Metal". It is one of the world's largest and longest-running heavy metal websites. The site now has an international staff of 16 members, and half a dozen additional contributors from around the world, including Canada, United States, England, Sweden, Finland, Australia, Malaysia, Estonia, and most recently, India. 

The website contains a wide range of features, including news, CD, DVD, and book reviews, concert reviews, and interviews.  The site has almost 8,000 CD and DVD reviews, over 1,000 interviews with musicians and metal fans, and over 700 concert reviews. In the summer of 2011, Metal-Rules introduced a new section called The Library Of Loudness, specializing in hard rock and heavy metal book reviews. This section currently has over 145 book reviews. The site also has a number of Internet chat forums, with over 100,000 registered members since its inception.  Other features include audio and video streaming, interactive polls, editorial pieces, cartoons, guitar samples and tabs, tour blogs and more.

Metal Rules, alongside Metal Sludge, was cited in a New York Times article, after the death of Dimebag Darrell in 2004. Its tribute to Ronnie James Dio was featured on Brave Words & Bloody Knuckles website. It received praise from the heavy metal world.

Metal Rules Records 
In 2002, the site founded Metal Rules Records. On December 30, 2002, Metal-Rules Records released their first album, Metal-Rules.com Volume I. The album is a 16-track compilation CD, featuring songs from heavy metal bands worldwide. The CD was mastered by Mark Briody of Jag Panzer. On July 24, 2004, the label released its second record, The Predator Awakens by Viperine.

References

External links 
 Metal Rules website
 Metal Rules Records website

Music magazines published in Canada
Heavy metal publications
Magazines established in 1995
1995 establishments in Canada
Online magazines published in Canada
Online music magazines published in Canada